The 1986 Nevada Wolf Pack football team represented the University of Nevada, Reno during the 1986 NCAA Division I-AA football season. Nevada competed as a member of the Big Sky Conference (BSC). The Wolf Pack were led by 11th-year head coach Chris Ault and played their home games at Mackay Stadium.

Schedule

References

Nevada
Nevada Wolf Pack football seasons
Big Sky Conference football champion seasons
Nevada Wolf Pack football